Maple Grove Transit is a suburban public transit provider in the Minneapolis – Saint Paul metropolitan area of Minnesota serving the city of Maple Grove. The service currently operates 5 express routes from Maple Grove to Downtown Minneapolis in the morning and return from Minneapolis to Maple Grove in the afternoon. An additional express route runs between the municipality and the University of Minnesota. One feeder route with timed transfers also connects with the Downtown express routes. Local flex service is provided by the agency, as well.

Maple Grove Transit is one of several "opt-out" public transit operations in the Twin Cities region which run their own services rather than rely on the area's primary provider, Metro Transit. MGT began operations in June 1990.

Maple Grove Transit Station

The Maple Grove Transit Station serves as the primary hub for the Maple Grove Transit System. The station opened for service in December 2003 and contains a 926 stall parking structure, bike lockers and racks and an indoor waiting area with restrooms and a drinking fountain. As of June 2022, the station serves Maple Grove Transit routes 781 and 789, as well as intercity bus services operated by Jefferson Lines.

Route list

780 Shepherd of the Grove Church Park & Ride to Downtown Minneapolis
781 Maple Grove Transit Center to Downtown Minneapolis
782 Zachary Lane Park & Ride to Downtown Minneapolis
783 Crosswinds Church Park & Ride to Downtown Minneapolis
785 Parkway Station to Downtown Minneapolis
787 Maple Grove Flex Route
788 Bass Lake Center to Crosswinds Church Park & Ride
789 Maple Grove Transit Center to University of Minnesota

See also
 List of bus transit systems in the United States
 Metro Transit (Minnesota)

References

External links
Maple Grove Transit
Metropolitan Council information on new route 720

Transportation in Minnesota
Bus transportation in Minnesota